Cliff Mansley (1921-2006) was a footballer who played as a wing half in the Football League for Chester.

References

1921 births
2006 deaths
People from Skipton
Association football wing halves
English footballers
Preston North End F.C. players
Barnsley F.C. players
Chester City F.C. players
Yeovil Town F.C. players
Leyton Orient F.C. players
English Football League players
Footballers from North Yorkshire